James Engle (1757 – January 5, 1821) fought in the American Revolutionary War, was a member of the Pennsylvania House of Representatives from Philadelphia County and served as speaker in 1809.

Early life
Engle was born in Germantown, Pennsylvania.

Military service
Engle enlisted at age 19, (other sources list 18) was a sergeant, ensign (commissioned September 20, 1776), and second lieutenant (promoted 1777) in the Third Regiment Pennsylvania Line.  He enlisted in Captain Samuel Watson's company.  Engle served in the following locations/battles:

 Canadian campaign
 Ticonderoga
 Germantown
 Valley Forge

Political Activities
Engle was a member of the Democratic Republican party.

He was elected to the Pennsylvania House of Representatives in 1801.  (Other Democratic Republicans elected along with him from Philadelphia County included Jacob Holgate, William Penrose, Elijah Gordon, John Goodman, and George Ingles.)  There were no opposition candidates from the Federalist Party.

In 1808, he received 4,374 votes for his seat in the House.

On December 21, 1808, Engle was elected Speaker of the Pennsylvania House of Representatives.

Personal life
Engle married Margaret Marshall on May 4, 1785.

Other activities
Engle was a member of the Guardians of the Poor.

Death
Engle died in Philadelphia.

Descendants
 Daughter: Sarah Engle, Philadelphia.  Married to Robert Patterson.
 Grandson: Robert Emmet Patterson, Philadelphia.  Elected to membership in the Sons of the American Revolution: December 11, 1893.

 Great-Granddaughter: Susan Engle Negus, Philadelphia

See also
 Speaker of the Pennsylvania House of Representatives

References

1757 births
1821 deaths
Members of the Pennsylvania House of Representatives
Speakers of the Pennsylvania House of Representatives
Politicians from Philadelphia